Orto-Tokoy Reservoir or Ortotokoy Reservoir, is a reservoir of the Chu River, located in Kochkor District of Naryn Region of Kyrgyzstan. It has a surface area of 24 km 2 and a maximum volume of 470 × 106 meters 3.

References

Reservoirs built in the Soviet Union
Reservoirs in Kyrgyzstan
Chu (river)
Syr Darya basin